The 49th Troop Carrier Squadron is an inactive United States Air Force unit.  Its last assignment was with the 313th Troop Carrier Group at Camp Myles Standish, Massachusetts, where it was inactivated on 22 September 1945.

The squadron was first activated as the 49th Transport Squadron in June 1942.    As the 49th Troop Carrier Squadron, it flew Douglas C-47 Skytrains in the Mediterranean Theater of Operations during World War II, earning Distinguished Unit Citations for carrying reinforcements to Sicily despite fire from ground and naval forces in July 1943, and for participation in Operation Overlord in June 1944.  It converted to Curtiss C-46 Commandos, with which it took part in Operation Varsity.  After V-E Day, the squadron returned to the United States, where it was inactivated.

History
The squadron as activated at Daniel Field, Georgia in June 1942 as the 49th Transport Squadron, when the 313th Transport Group expanded from a headquarters and a single squadron, the 29th Troop Carrier Squadron, to a four squadron group. The squadron trained under Air Transport Command with Douglas C-47 Skytrains.  A few weeks after the squadron's activation, the Army Air Forces gave the "transport" designation to its strategic airlift units, and the squadron became the 49th Troop Carrier Squadron under I Troop Carrier Command.  The 49th trained in the southeastern United States until April 1943, when it deployed to North Africa.

Mediterranean operations
The squadron began flying combat missions from Oujda Airfield in French Morocco. It performed troop carrier and transport airlift of supplies to ground forces advancing through Algeria into Tunisia as part Twelfth Air Force.  It also evacuated wounded from the battle area.

Although the 49th did not take part in the first airdrop of Operation Husky, the Allied invasion of Sicily, two days later, 11 July 1943, the squadron was part of a formation of troop carrier units of the 52d Troop Carrier Wing bringing reinforcements, planning to drop paratroops near Gela.  Planes of the 313th Group led the stream of troop carriers.  However, attacks in the Gela area by enemy aircraft had sunk two ships and forced other ships in the invasion force to disperse.  The heaviest enemy attack came at 2150 hours.  Fifty minutes later, the first 313th Group aircraft approached the drop zone.  The 49th was able to successfully make its drop on Farello Airfield.  Mistaking the troop carriers for another enemy attack, ships of the assault force and antiaircraft units ashore began a heavy fire on squadron's C-47s as they departed.  Of the 144 planes of the 52d Wing that participated in the mission, 23 were shot down and an additional 37 were heavily damaged. For its completion of this mission the squadron earned its first Distinguished Unit Citation (DUC).

European operations

In February 1944, the squadron moved to RAF Folkingham, England, where it became part of IX Troop Carrier Command and began training for the assault on the continent of Europe.  On D-Day the squadron dropped paratroopers near Picauville, Normandy and dropped reinforcements the following day.  The squadron's efforts during Operation Overlord earned it a second DUC.

On 17 September, the squadron participated in Operation Market Garden, the airborne assault on the Netherlands, when it dropped troopers near Arnhem and Nijmegen.  In February 1945, the squadron moved to Achiet Airfield in France, where it began converting to Curtiss C-46 Commandos in preparation for Operation Varsity, the airborne assault across the Rhine.  On 24 March 1945 it dropped elements of the 17th Airborne Division near Wesel.

The squadron continued to operate from Achiet during 1945, performing transportation of personnel and supplies within Europe.  It evacuated wounded and former prisoners of war and brought gasoline, ammunition to forward areas.  After V-E Day, it continued to transport medical equipment and other supplies.  In September, the squadron's personnel returned to the United States and it was inactivated on arrival at the port of embarkation.

Lineage
 Constituted as the 49th Transport Squadron on 15 June 1942
 Activated on 2 March 1942
 Redesignated 49th Troop Carrier Squadron on 4 July 1942
 Inactivated on 22 September 1945

Assignments
 313th Transport Group (later Troop Carrier Group), 2 March 1942 – 22 September 1945

Stations

 Daniel Field, Georgia, 15 January 1942
 Bowman Field, Kentucky, 21 June 1942
 Florence Army Air Field, South Carolina, 4 August 1942
 Laurinburg-Maxton Army Air Base, North Carolina, 13 December 1942 – 25 April 1943
 Oujda Airfield, French Morocco, 11 May 1943
 Kairouan Airfield, Tunisia, 16 June 1943

 Sciacca Airdrome, Sicily, Italy 4 September 1943
 Trapani/Milo Airfield, Sicily, Italy, 3 October 1943 – 15 February 1944
 RAF Folkingham (AAF-484), England, 24 February 1944
 Achiet Airfield (B-54), France, 28 March-5 August 1945
 Camp Myles Standish, Massachusetts, 21–22 September 1945

Aircraft
 C-47 Skytrain, 1942–1945
 C-46 Commando, 1945

Awards and campaigns

References

Notes
 Explanatory notes

 Citations

Bibliography

External links

049